Ramsei railway station is a railway station in the municipality of Lützelflüh, in the Swiss canton of Bern. It is located at the junction of the standard gauge  and Solothurn–Langnau lines of BLS AG.

Services 
The following services stop at Ramsei:

References

External links 
 
 

Railway stations in the canton of Bern
BLS railway stations